Balkovci is a settlement on the left bank of the Kolpa River in the Municipality of Črnomelj in the White Carniola area of southeastern Slovenia. It includes four hamlets: Dejani, Grduni, Pavlini, and Balkovci. The area is part of the traditional region of Lower Carniola and is now included in the Southeast Slovenia Statistical Region.

Demographic evolution

References

External links
Balkovci on Geopedia

Populated places in the Municipality of Črnomelj